Wang Chih-kang (born 7 September 1942) is a Taiwanese Mainlander politician.

Wang holds a doctorate from Texas A&M University.

Wang was the first chairman of the Fair Trade Commission between 1992 and 1996. He then served as Ministry of Economic Affairs until 2000. From July 2008 to September 2014, Wang led the Taiwan External Trade Development Council. In January 2019, Wang was appointed chairman of the Taiwan Institute of Economic Research. Wang has also served on the Central Standing Committee of the Kuomintang.

References

1942 births
Living people
Republic of China politicians from Hebei
Taiwanese people from Hebei
Taiwanese Ministers of Economic Affairs
20th-century Taiwanese economists
Kuomintang politicians in Taiwan
Texas A&M University alumni
21st-century Taiwanese economists